Jill Chapman-Daily (born November 4, 1979) is a former professional basketball player. She played 19 games for the Detroit Shock.

Indiana statistics

Source

Professional statistics

|-
|2002
|Detroit	
|19	
|0	
|6.3
|.370
|.000
|.667	
|1.4	
|0.0	
|0.2	
|0.1	
|0.4
|1.2

After Basketball
Jill Chapman ended her basketball career in 2003 shortly after the birth of her first daughter.

References

External links
WNBA.com: Jill Chapman Player Info

1979 births
Living people
American women's basketball players
Detroit Shock players
Indiana Hoosiers women's basketball players
Centers (basketball)